Andre Jackson Jr. (born November 13, 2001) is an American college basketball player for UConn Huskies of the Big East Conference.

Early life and high school
Jackson grew up in Amsterdam, New York and attended The Albany Academy. Jackson played on the United States select team in the 2018 Albert Schweitzer Tournament. He averaged 18.8 points, 10.1 rebounds, 5.1 assists, and 3.0 steals per game during his senior season and was named the New York Sports Writers Association Class A Player of the Year. Jackson committed to play college basketball at UConn over offers from Iowa, Maryland, UCLA, and Syracuse.

College career
Jackson played in 16 games during his freshman season at UConn and averaged 2.7 points, 2.9 rebounds, and 1.6 assists per game. He missed seven games due to a broken left wrist. Jackson started all but one of the Huskies' games as a sophomore and averaged 6.8 points and 6.8 rebounds per game. 

Jackson was named a team captain entering his junior season. He missed the first three games of the season after fracturing the pinky finger on his right hand during preseason practices.

Personal life
Both of Jackson's parents, Tricia Altieri and Andre Jackson Sr., played college basketball at Fulton–Montgomery Community College.

References

External links
UConn Huskies bio

Living people
African-American basketball players
American men's basketball players
Basketball players from New York (state)
Shooting guards
The Albany Academy alumni
UConn Huskies men's basketball players